Sergei Bolshakov (born June 2, 1996) is a Russian professional ice hockey goaltender. He is currently playing with Khimik Voskresensk of the Supreme Hockey League (VHL).

On September 25, 2014, Bolshakov made his Kontinental Hockey League debut playing with Amur Khabarovsk during the 2014–15 KHL season. On May 1, 2016, Bolshakov opted to transfer from Khabarovsk in agreeing to a contract with KHL rival, HC Sochi.

From October 2, 2021, the Dynamo-Minsk goalkeeper

References

External links

1996 births
Living people
Amur Khabarovsk players
Russian ice hockey goaltenders
Ice hockey people from Moscow